Ari David Shaffir (born February 12, 1974) is an American comedian, actor, podcaster, writer, and producer. He  produces and hosts the Skeptic Tank podcast. He also co-hosts the podcast Punch Drunk Sports with Jayson Thibault and Sam Tripoli, and is a regular guest on The Joe Rogan Experience podcast on the "Protect Our Parks" episodes with Shane Gillis and Mark Normand. He created and previously hosted and produced the This is Not Happening television series, an adaptation of his monthly stand-up show.



Early life 
Ari David Shaffir was born in New York City to a Jewish family of Romanian Jewish descent. His father was a Holocaust survivor. The family was raised conservative Jewish until Ari was nine years old and the family moved to Maryland, where they adopted Orthodox Jewish beliefs. When he was 16, he worked at Arlington National Cemetery.

Shaffir attended high school in Rockville, Maryland. He went on to study for two years at Yeshiva University in New York City before transferring to University of Maryland, where he graduated in 1999 with a degree in English literature. Shaffir played on the University's NCAA golf team in 1995 and claims he was the lowest-ranked NCAA athlete.

Career 
Shaffir's first and only comedy performance on stage before he moved to Los Angeles took place in his early twenties at an open mic night at a "sports comedy place in Northern Virginia". Following his graduation from university, Shaffir moved to Los Angeles to improve his chances of success as a stand-up comedian. He took up work answering the phones at The Comedy Store, which led to positions in the cover booth and "the door", until owner Mitzi Shore made him a paid regular, four-and-a-half years later.  His early influences in comedy include watching showcase comedy shows on television as a youngster and comedians on The Tonight Show with Johnny Carson. He cites Bill Burr as his favorite living comedian. He became bicoastal, living in both Los Angeles and New York City in 2012, hoping to advance his stand-up career further by increasing the number of sets he performed in a week at New York's many comedy clubs. He became a New York resident in 2015.

Shaffir first became known to a wider audience with the viral video series The Amazing Racist. He became an opening act for Joe Rogan in the late 2000s and began touring with Rogan and fellow comics Joey Diaz, Duncan Trussell, Tom Segura, Brian Redban and Eddie Bravo. In 2009 he appeared at the Montreal Comedy Festival as part of The Nasty Show. The following year he created, produced and hosted the monthly live show This Is Not Happening, with Eric Abrams, a stand-up comedy featuring numerous comedians telling true-life stories around a theme. The show would become a regular feature at comedy festivals and debuted as a web series in 2013 and premiered in January 2015 on Comedy Central. He left the show as producer and host in 2017
after selling his third special, Double Negative, to Netflix rather than Comedy Central. Roy Wood Jr. replaced him as host.

In 2010 Shaffir appeared on the 3rd episode of the Joe Rogan Experience, his first of 44 appearances on the show. In 2011, Shaffir began his podcast, Skeptic Tank. On most episodes, Shaffir picks a subject his guests (mostly comedians) can discuss as experts. While subjects are often comic he's also discussed serious issues such as mental health, suicide, rape, and prison. Every 50 episodes the comedy team Danish and O'Neill appear as guests. In 2013, Shaffir began to cohost the sports podcast Punch Drunk Sports with fellow comedians Sam Tripoli and Jayson Thibault. His appearances became less frequent after moving to the East Coast full-time.

Shaffir released his first stand-up album Revenge for the Holocaust in 2012 which became the number one comedy album on both Itunes and Amazon in its 1st week. In 2013 he produced his first television special, Passive Aggressive, for Chill.com. In 2015 his second special, Paid Regular, premiered on Comedy Central the same week This is Not Happening premiered on the same channel. In 2017 he premiered Double Negative on Netflix, two 45 minute shows (based on the concept of a double album), the first titled Children and the second named Adulthood. As of 2019 he's been touring with the show Ari Shaffir: Jew, the next special he intends to film. He premiered Double Negative and Ari Shaffir: Jew at the Edinburgh Fringe Festival.

Shaffir spent several years earning a living as a commercial actor, appearing in ads for Coke Zero, Subway, Dominos, and Bud Light. He appeared in the comedy feature film Keeping Up with the Joneses (2016). As of 2017, Shaffir claims to have no interest in pursuing acting which could take him away from his stand-up.

Following the death of Kobe Bryant, Shaffir caused controversy after he posted a video on his Twitter page about the event, celebrating the death of Kobe Bryant and his daughter, along with the rest of the crew and passengers. "Kobe Bryant died 23 years too late today," Shaffir says in the video. "He got away with rape because all the Hollywood liberals who attack comedy enjoy rooting for the Lakers more than they dislike rape. Big ups to the hero who forgot to gas up his chopper. I hate the Lakers. What a great day." A New York comedy club where Shaffir was scheduled to perform canceled his performance after it received phone threats.

Filmography

Film 
The Fax (2004; short film)
Reeling in Reality (2005)
Pauly Shore's Natural Born Komics (2007)
inAPPropriate Comedy (2013)
Keeping Up with the Joneses (2016)

Stand-up specials 
Revenge for the Holocaust (2012)
Passive Aggressive (2013)
Paid Regular (2015)
Double Negative (2017)
Jew (2022)

Television 
Minding the Store (2005; three episodes)
West Side Stories (2012; television film)
This Is Not Happening (2013–2017)
What's Your F@#Cking Deal?!?! (2016)

References

External links 

1974 births
Living people
Jewish American comedians
American male film actors
American male television actors
American podcasters
American sketch comedians
American stand-up comedians
Comedians from New York City
Male television writers
Secular Jews
American people of Romanian-Jewish descent
21st-century American comedians
University of Maryland, College Park alumni
Stand Up! Records artists
Former Orthodox Jews
21st-century American screenwriters
Comedians from North Carolina
Comedians from Maryland
21st-century American Jews